Chavdar Kostov (born 18 April 1988) is a Bulgarian professional basketball player who currently plays for Rilski Sportist of the NBL.

Professional career 
From 2005 to 2010, Kostov played with Lukoil Academic in Bulgaria, where he also started his pro career. During his tenue with the team, he won 5 Bulgarian championships and 3 Bulgarian Cups. On 5 October 2010 he signed a one-year deal with Kavala of the Greek Basket League. He renewed his contract with the team until 2012.

On 2012 he signed a one-year deal with Bulgarian club Levski Sofia. On 25 May 2011 he returned to Lukoil Academic. After one season he left Lukoil, and signed with Austrian club UBC Güssing Knights. With the Kings, he won both the Austrian league and the Austrian Cup.

On 22 September 2015 he returned to Kavala.,  On 4 November 2016 Kostov signed with Kymis of the Greek Basket League, replacing Musa Abdul-Aleem on the team's squad.

On 15 August 2017 he signed with Macedonian club Rabotnički.

References

External links
 Chavdar Kostov at interperformances.com
 Chavdar Kostov at nbadraft.net
 Chavdar Kostov at eurobasket.com
 Chavdar Kostov at fiba.com

1988 births
Living people
BC Levski Sofia players
Bulgarian men's basketball players
Kavala B.C. players
KK Rabotnički players
Kymis B.C. players
PBC Academic players
Shooting guards
Basketball players from Sofia